Tugg Inc. was a film-based collective action and crowdsourcing platform that enabled individuals to create film screenings at their local cinema.  Tugg ceased operations in January 2020.

Incorporated in 2011, Tugg was officially launched in 2012 at SXSW by co-founders Nicolas Gonda and Pablo Gonzalez. Headquartered in Austin, Texas, it offered services for promoters, filmmakers, and theaters.

Services

Promoters 
Screening "hosts" selected a movie from Tugg's library of studio and independent films, chose from available theaters, dates, timeslots, and set other event details like ticket price; then, a set number of people needed to commit to attend before the event was actually on, in order to crowdsource the viewing. Tugg provided promotional resources and tips, but the promoter was responsible for publicity.

Tugg allowed filmmakers to show their films in movie theatres, allowing consumers to select the movies they wanted to see.  This distribution method, credited to Gonda, was "supposed to complement existing distribution methods".

Tugg EDU 
Tugg had a department focused on Educational and Non-Theatrical communities, TuggEDU.  It sold screening licenses to "effectively monetize the non-theatrical interest in a film".

In 2016 Tugg launched the film The Last Gold in partnership with USA Swimming,"

References

External links 
 Official Website



Film-related professional associations
Crowdsourcing